Psychonoctua is a genus of moths in the family Cossidae. It ranges from California to Guyana, with one species in the Greater Antilles.

Species
 Psychonoctua albogrisea (Dognin, 1916)
 Psychonoctua gilensis (Barnes & McDunnough, 1910)
 Psychonoctua masoni (Schaus, 1892)
 Psychonoctua nullifer Dyar, 1914
 Psychonoctua personalis Grote, 1865

References

Natural History Museum Lepidoptera generic names catalog

Zeuzerinae